Hibbertia truncata, commonly known as Port Campbell guinea-flower, is a species of flowering plant in the family Dilleniaceae and is endemic to Victoria in Australia. It is a prostrate to low-lying shrub with hairy foliage, broadly egg-shaped leaves with the narrower end towards the base, and yellow flowers with ten to twelve stamens joined in a single cluster on one side of two hairy carpels.

Description
Flowering occurs from September to November.

Taxonomy
Hibbertia truncata was first formally described in 1998 by Hellmut R. Toelken in the Journal of the Adelaide Botanic Gardens. The specific epithet (truncata) means "truncated" and refers to the leaf tips.

Distribution and habitat
This hibbertia usually grows in coastal heath on limestone in a few places between Peterborough and Port Campbell in Victoria, and is locally common.

See also
List of Hibbertia species

References

truncata
Flora of Victoria (Australia)
Plants described in 1998
Taxa named by Hellmut R. Toelken